Abbey Gardens is a community garden in East London built on the site of a Scheduled Ancient Monument.
The garden area was a row of cottages, and beneath is the remain of the gatehouse of the Stratford Langthorne Abbey. It is managed by a charity, The Friends of Abbey Gardens (Charity number 1158147).

The garden was created in 2008, by two artists, Nina Pope and Karen Guthrie.

References

External links 
 Abbey Gardens website
 London Borough of Newham
 What Will The Harvest Be

Gardens in London
Parks and open spaces in the London Borough of Newham
Scheduled monuments in London